The dorsal tarsometatarsal ligaments are ligaments located in the foot. They are strong, flat bands that stretch from the tarsal bones to the metatarsals .

The first metatarsal is joined to the first cuneiform by a broad, thin band; the second has three, one from each cuneiform bone; the third has one from the third cuneiform; the fourth has one from the third cuneiform and one from the cuboid; and the fifth, one from the cuboid.

References

Ligaments of the lower limb